Independent Tribune is a newspaper based in Concord, North Carolina covering Cabarrus County. The newspaper is owned by Lee Enterprises. The Independent Tribune was formed September 29, 1996, with the merger of The Concord Tribune and The Daily Independent of Kannapolis, North Carolina.

It was originally a daily newspaper, but changed to three days a week in 2009.

On March 15, 2020, Media General announced the sale of its newspapers to Berkshire Hathaway's BH Media.

On January 29, 2020, Lee Enterprises announced it would buy BH Media, including 30 newspapers.

References

External links

Newspapers published in North Carolina
Concord, North Carolina
Cabarrus County, North Carolina
1996 establishments in North Carolina
Newspapers established in 1996
Lee Enterprises publications